Major facilitator superfamily domain containing 5 is an atypical SLC expressed in neuronal plasma membrane. It is a plausible Solute carrier transporter. It transports molybdate anions, and it interacts with GLP-1R.

MFSD5 belongs to AMTF6.

References 

Solute carrier family